The following is a partial list of the "N" codes for Medical Subject Headings (MeSH), as defined by the United States National Library of Medicine (NLM).

This list continues the information at List of MeSH codes (N02). Codes following these are found at List of MeSH codes (N04). For other MeSH codes, see List of MeSH codes.

The source for this content is the set of 2006 MeSH Trees from the NLM.

– health care economics and organizations

– economics
  – compensation and redress
  – costs and cost analysis
  – cost allocation
  – cost-benefit analysis
  – cost control
  – cost savings
  – cost of illness
  – cost sharing
  – deductibles and coinsurance
  – medical savings accounts
  – health care costs
  – direct service costs
  – drug costs
  – employer health costs
  – hospital costs
  – health expenditures
  – capital expenditures
  – economic competition
  –  dental economics
  –  dental fees
  –  hospital economics
  – hospital charges
  – hospital costs
  –  medical economics
  –  medical fees
  –  nursing economics
  –  pharmaceutical economics
  – fees and charges
  – capitation fee
  – fee-for-service plans
  –  dental fees
  –  medical fees
  –  pharmaceutical fees
  – prescription fees
  – hospital charges
  – prescription fees
  – rate setting and review
  – financial management
  – accounting
  – accounts payable and receivable
  – depreciation
  – financial audit
  – patient credit and collection
  – bankruptcy
  – budgets
  – rate setting and review
  – capital financing
  – contract services
  – competitive bidding
  – outsourced services
  –  hospital financial management
  –  construction financing
  – fund raising
  – group purchasing
  –  property leasing
  – marketing of health services
  – risk management
  –  financial risk sharing
  – financial support
  – foundations
  – health planning support
  – research support
  – training support
  – fellowships and scholarships
  –  organized financing
  –  government financing
  – public assistance
  – medical assistance
  – medicaid
  – Medicare
  – medicare part a
  – medicare part b
  – medicare part c
  – old age assistance
  – social security
  – aid to families with dependent children
  – veterans disability claims
  – workers' compensation
  – insurance
  – cost sharing
  – deductibles and coinsurance
  – medical savings accounts
  – insurance benefits
  – insurance carriers
  – insurance claim reporting
  – insurance claim review
  – insurance coverage
  – universal coverage
  –  disability insurance
  – workers' compensation
  –  Health Insurance
  –  employee health benefit plans
  – employee retirement income security act
  – Health Insurance Portability and Accountability Act
  –  accident insurance
  –  dental insurance
  – insurance, health, reimbursement
  –  hospitalization insurance
  – Blue Cross
  –  major medical insurance
  –  medigap insurance
  –  nursing services insurance
  –  pharmaceutical services insurance
  –  physician services insurance
  – blue shield
  – medicare assignment
  –  psychiatric insurance
  –  surgical insurance
  – managed care programs
  – competitive medical plans
  – health maintenance organizations
  – independent practice associations
  – patient freedom of choice laws
  – preferred provider organizations
  – provider-sponsored organizations
  – managed competition
  – medical savings accounts
  – Medicare
  – medicare assignment
  – medicare part a
  – medicare part b
  – medicare part c
  –  united states national health insurance
  – prepaid health plans
  – health maintenance organizations
  – single-payer system
  –  liability insurance
  –  life insurance
  – insurance pools
  – insurance selection bias
  – social security
  – insurance, health, reimbursement
  – reimbursement mechanisms
  – fee-for-service plans
  – Blue Cross
  – blue shield
  – physician payment review commission
  – prospective payment system
  – diagnosis-related groups
  –  drg outliers
  – Medicare Payment Advisory Commission
  – prospective payment assessment commission
  –  disproportionate share reimbursement
  –  incentive reimbursement
  – relative value scales
  – single-payer system
  –  personal financing
  – medical savings accounts
  – health care sector
  –  economic inflation
  – investments
  – medical indigency
  – taxes
  – income tax
  – Tax Equity and Fiscal Responsibility Act
  – tax exemption

– health planning
  – health care rationing
  – health care reform
  – health plan implementation
  – health planning guidelines
  – health planning technical assistance
  – health priorities
  – health resources
  – health services research
  – health care surveys
  – health services needs and demand
  – needs assessment
  – organizational case studies
  – national health programs
  –  united states national health insurance
  – single-payer system
  – regional health planning
  – catchment area (health)
  – certificate of need
  – community health planning
  – health facility planning
  – bed conversion
  – hospital planning
  – health systems plans
  – medically underserved area
  – regional medical programs
  – state health plans

– organizations
  – academies and institutes
  – congresses
  – consensus development conferences
  –  nih consensus development conferences
  – consumer organizations
  – consumer participation
  – patient participation
  – government agencies
  – united states department of agriculture
  – united states department of veterans affairs
  – United States Department of Health and Human Services
  – united states Centers for Medicare and Medicaid Services
  – United States Public Health Service
  – Centers for Disease Control and Prevention
  – national institute for occupational safety and health
  – national center for health care technology
  – national center for health statistics (u.s.)
  – National Institutes of Health
  – national institute of mental health (u.s.)
  – national library of medicine (u.s.)
  – united states Agency for Healthcare Research and Quality
  – united states Food and Drug Administration
  – united states Health Resources and Services Administration
  – national health planning information center
  – United States Indian health service
  – united states office of research integrity
  – united states substance abuse and mental health services administration
  – united states environmental protection agency
  – united states federal trade commission
  – united states government agencies
  – united states national aeronautics and space administration
  – united states occupational safety and health administration
  – united states office of economic opportunity
  – united states office of technology assessment
  – united states Social Security Administration
  – health planning organizations
  – health care coalitions
  – health planning councils
  – state health planning and development agencies
  – health systems agencies
  – home care agencies
  – international agencies
  – red cross
  – United Nations
  – World Health Organization
  – Pan American Health Organization
  – labor unions
  – collective bargaining
  –  employee strikes
  – national academy of sciences (u.s.)
  – institute of medicine (u.s.)
  –  nonprofit organizations
  – foundations
  – voluntary health agencies
  – american cancer society
  – American Heart Association
  – mental health associations
  – red cross
  – tuberculosis societies
  – self-help groups
  – Alcoholics Anonymous
  – societies
  – american public health association
  – American Speech–Language–Hearing Association
  –  dental societies
  – American Dental Association
  –  hospital societies
  – American Hospital Association
  –  medical societies
  – American Medical Association
  –  nursing societies
  – American Nurses' Association
  – International Council of Nurses
  –  pharmaceutical societies
  –  scientific societies

–  formal social control
  – credentialing
  – accreditation
  – Joint Commission on Accreditation of Healthcare Organizations
  – certification
  – specialty boards
  – licensure
  –  dental licensure
  –  hospital licensure
  –  medical licensure
  –  nursing licensure
  –  pharmacy licensure
  – facility regulation and control
  – government regulation
  – human rights
  – child advocacy
  – civil rights
  – privacy
  – genetic privacy
  – consumer advocacy
  – freedom
  – personal autonomy
  – patient rights
  – confidentiality
  – genetic privacy
  – informed consent
  – patient access to records
  – right to die
  – treatment refusal
  – reproductive rights
  – social justice
  – women's rights
  – jurisprudence
  – advance directives
  – living wills
  – compensation and redress
  – confidentiality
  – duty to warn
  – genetic privacy
  – contracts
  – duty to recontact
  – expert testimony
  – forensic psychiatry
  – commitment of mentally ill
  – insanity defense
  – informed consent
  – consent forms
  – third-party consent
  – parental consent
  – intellectual property
  – copyright
  – patents
  –  legal liability
  – malpractice
  – defensive medicine
  – professional impairment
  – physician impairment
  – mandatory reporting
  – mental competency
  – presumed consent
  – resuscitation orders
  – wrongful life
  – legislation
  – antitrust laws
  –  dental legislation
  –  drug legislation
  – drug and narcotic control
  –  food legislation
  –  hospital legislation
  – Patient Self-Determination Act
  –  medical legislation
  –  nursing legislation
  –  pharmacy legislation
  –  veterinary legislation
  – patient freedom of choice laws
  – threshold limit values
  – mandatory programs
  – mandatory reporting
  – mandatory testing
  – patient advocacy
  – peer review
  –  health care peer review
  –  research peer review
  – policy making
  – advisory committees
  – social control policies
  – organizational policy
  – public policy
  – family planning policy
  – health policy
  – health care reform
  – nutrition policy

– state dentistry

– state medicine

–  biomedical technology assessment

The list continues at List of MeSH codes (N04).

N03